Cisthene petrovna is a moth of the family Erebidae. It was described by William Schaus in 1892. It is found in the Brazilian state of Rio de Janeiro.

References

Cisthenina
Moths described in 1892